Xingong Station is a station on the  and  of the Beijing Subway.

Station Layout 
The station has underground dual-island platforms for both Daxing line and line 19.

Exits 
There are 6 exits, lettered A, B, C, E, F and G. Exits B and E are accessible.

Gallery

References

External links

Beijing Subway stations in Fengtai District
Railway stations in China opened in 2010